Forestburg is a village located in east-central Alberta, Canada. The rich farmland of the area was first settled in 1905. Soon after the first of many "gopher hole" mines, homesteaders were soon coal mining on the banks of the Battle River in 1907.

Forestburg's economy is based on agriculture, coal mining, oil and gas activity, and power generation. With approximately 75 businesses, the rate of employment is good. Forestburg has a good variety of retail and services, with major employment by Atco Power Ltd. and Westmoreland Coal. The village is the headquarters of the Battle River Railway, a co-operative railway established in 2009.

History
The site was surveyed in 1919 after the Canadian Northern Railway arrived in 1916, and Forestburg was incorporated into a village.

Geography

Climate

Demographics 

In the 2016 Census of Population conducted by Statistics Canada, the Village of Forestburg recorded a population of 875 living in 360 of its 404 total private dwellings, a  change from its 2011 population of 831.

The population of the Village of Forestburg according to its 2014 municipal census is 880, a  change from its 2011 federal census population of 831.

Notable people 
Evan Oberg, professional hockey player

See also 
List of communities in Alberta
List of villages in Alberta

References

External links 

1919 establishments in Alberta
Flagstaff County
Villages in Alberta